Sin-Iqisham ruled the ancient Near East city-state of Larsa from 1776 BC to 1771 BC. He was the son of Sin-Eribam and a contemporary of Zambiya of Isin.

The annals for his five-year reign record that he seized Pinaratim and Nazarum in his second year, and that he defeated Kazallu, Elam, and Zambiya, king of Isin and Babylon in his fifth year.

See also 

 Chronology of the ancient Near East

Notes

External links 
 Sin-Iqisham Year Names at CDLI

Amorite kings
18th-century BC Sumerian kings
Kings of Larsa
18th-century BC people